Turulung is a commune of 3,910 inhabitants situated in Satu Mare County, Romania. It is composed of three villages: Drăgușeni (Túrterebestelep), Turulung and Turulung-Vii (Túrterebesszőlőhegy).

The commune is located in the northern part of the county, on the banks of the Tur River.

Demographics
Ethnic groups (2002 census): 
Hungarians: 55.34%
Romanians: 31.88%
Romanies (Gypsies): 9.10%

According to mother tongue, 67.98% of the population speak Hungarian as first their language, while 31.72% speak Romanian.

Natives
Pál Reizer
Jenő Schönberger

References

Communes in Satu Mare County